Cherry Orchard is a suburb within South Dublin, Ireland. It is located near Ballyfermot, Inchicore, Drimnagh, Kilmainham and Clondalkin. Cherry Orchard F.C. was founded in 1957. The parish Church of the Holy Sacrament, which opened in 1992, is located on  Cherry Orchard Avenue.

Revamp plan for 'new towns'
In August 2015, it was announced that a 10-point plan has been devised for Cherry Orchard and Park West which, if accepted, will provide future development of the area. Plans devised for the locality in 2002 were stalled due to the economic downturn and the council has proposed developing infrastructure, including shops and public transport.

References

Towns and villages in Dublin (city)